Travis Paul Major (born 18 February 1990) is an Australian professional footballer player. He plays as a forward for National Premier Leagues NSW club Blacktown City.

Career
On 3 January 2015, he signed for A-League side Central Coast Mariners. He scored his first and only goal in a 5–1 defeat to Sydney FC.

Major spent the 2016–17 season with Hong Kong club Pegasus. He was released by the club following the season. In August 2017, Major re-joined Pegasus during their pre-season training camp in Thailand. After almost three years at the club, Major left again on 22 April 2019 because of family reasons.

On 31 May 2019, Southern announced via Facebook that Major had signed for the 2019–20 season. On 19 April 2020, due to circumstances brought on by the 2020 coronavirus pandemic, Southern bought out the remainder of Major's contract.

On 12 February 2021, Major returned to Blacktown City whom he had last played for in 2016.

On September 3, 2021, it was announced that Major was signed by the I-League side RoundGlass Punjab for a season. Major would play the season deployed as a midfielder and go on to lead the league in assists (8).

On June 24, 2022, Major would return to Blacktown city in the mid season transfer window, his return led to Blacktown being crowned NSW NPL champions in a 2-0 victory over Manly United, where Major was announced man of the match and received the Robbie Slater medal. Major would also score his 100th goal for the club in the final, the first player in the clubs history to reach this milestone.

Honours
Blacktown City
National Premier Leagues: 2015 
National Premier Leagues NSW Championship: 2010, 2014, 2016, 2022
National premier leagues NSW Championship runner-up: 2015
National Premier Leagues NSW Premiership: 2015  
Waratah Cup: 2014
Waratah Cup runner-up: 2015

Individual
National Premier Leagues NSW Team of The Year: 2011, 2012, 2013, 2014  
Player of the year NPL NSW: 2014
Robbie Slater Medalist: 2022

References

External links

Living people
Australian soccer players
Association football forwards
Central Coast Mariners FC players
Blacktown City FC players
A-League Men players
National Premier Leagues players
Hong Kong Premier League players
TSW Pegasus FC players
Southern District FC players
1990 births
Hong Kong League XI representative players
RoundGlass Punjab FC players
Expatriate footballers in India
I-League players
Australian expatriate sportspeople in India